Adrian Lee Bird (born 8 July 1969) is an English former professional footballer who played 27 games in the Football League for Birmingham City. He played as a centre half.

Bird was born in Bristol. When he left school in 1985 he joined Birmingham City as an apprentice, turning professional two years later. He made his debut for the club as a 17-year-old apprentice, on 29 December 1986 in a 1–1 draw at home to Millwall in the Second Division. By the 1988–89 season Bird was beginning to establish himself as a first-team player when he suffered a knee injury which effectively ended his career. He spent a year at the Football Injuries Treatment Centre at Lilleshall, and attempted a comeback with Moor Green, but was forced to retire from the game in 1991 at the age of only 21.

References

1969 births
Living people
English footballers
Association football defenders
Birmingham City F.C. players
Moor Green F.C. players
English Football League players
Footballers from Bristol